José Pérez Allende (born 19 March 1906, date of death unknown) was a Mexican equestrian. He competed in the individual eventing at the 1932 Summer Olympics. He won two gold medals and a silver at the Central American and Caribbean Games, and a gold medal at the 1955 Pan American Games.

References

External links
 

1906 births
Year of death missing
Mexican male equestrians

Olympic equestrians of Mexico
Equestrians at the 1932 Summer Olympics
Place of birth missing
Pan American Games medalists in equestrian
Pan American Games gold medalists for Mexico
Pan American Games bronze medalists for Mexico
Equestrians at the 1955 Pan American Games
Medalists at the 1955 Pan American Games